Contradictio in terminis (Latin for contradiction in terms) refers to a combination of words whose meanings are in conflict with one another. Examples are "liquid ice", "independent colony" and "square circle".

If the contradiction is intentional (rhetorical or poetic), then one can speak of an oxymoron.

See also
Contradiction
Meinong's jungle
Oxymoron
Paradox
Principle of contradiction
Self-refuting idea
Contradictio in adjecto

Latin logical phrases

sv:Självmotsägelse